Maren Haile-Selassie (born 13 March 1999) is a Swiss footballer who plays for Chicago Fire on loan from Lugano as a left midfielder.

Club career
Haile-Selassie made his professional debut for Zürich in a 2–1 Swiss Super League win over Thun on 30 July 2017.

On 9 January 2019, Haile-Selassie was loaned out to Rapperswil-Jona. On 10 July 2019, he was then loaned out to Neuchâtel Xamax for the 2019–20 season.

On 20 December 2021, Haile-Selassie signed a contract with Lugano until 30 June 2025.

On 15 May 2022, Haile-Selassie scored a goal in Lugano's 4–1 victory over St. Gallen in the final of the Swiss Cup.

On 27 December 2022, it was announced that Haile-Selassie would play with Major League Soccer side Chicago Fire for their 2023 season, with Chicago holding an option to make the move permanent.

International career
Haile-Selassie was born in Switzerland to Ethiopian parents. He is a former youth international for Switzerland.

Honours
Lugano
Swiss Cup: 2021–22

References

External links
 profile
 DbFCZ Profile
 
 SFL Profile
 
 

1999 births
Living people
Footballers from Zürich
Association football midfielders
Swiss men's footballers
Switzerland youth international footballers
Swiss people of Ethiopian descent
Swiss Super League players
Swiss Challenge League players
FC Zürich players
FC Rapperswil-Jona players
FC Wil players
Neuchâtel Xamax FCS players
FC Lugano players
Chicago Fire FC players